Navia ocellata is a plant species in the genus Navia. This species is endemic to Venezuela.

References

ocellata
Flora of Venezuela